Pao baileyi, the hairy pufferfish, is a species of pufferfish usually found in the rocky habitats, including rapids, of the Mekong mainstream and its larger tropical freshwater tributaries.

Characteristics
P. baileyi grows to around  SL and can be identified by sparse, or dense, coverage of epidermal outgrowths or cirri on the head and body. The cirri tend to be more profuse in the juvenile state, becoming reduced or non-existent at higher ages. The abdomen is usually golden or orange, with no other markings. Like other pufferfish P. baileyi is scaleless, and is therefore extremely sensitive to water quality.

In Aquaria
P. Baileyi is occasionally kept in the aquarium. The unattractive features along with the inactive nature of this fish make it unappealing to be kept. It is commonly fed both dead and live fish, and while it is not known to be a picky eater, it is strictly a carnivore. The fish often fetches a high price, commonly going over $100 USD.

Behavior
The behavior of the Hairy Pufferfish is widely debated and seems to depend widely on the individual. Accounts of behavior differ widely, with some saying that the fish is highly active and others saying the opposite. It is known to be an ambush predator and is extremely aggressive. As is natural with pufferfish, if the individual is frightened to the point of death, they will expand into a ball-like shape. The Hairy Pufferfish is known to be an incredibly smart animal, and will commonly recognize faces if in captivity.

References

Tetraodontidae
Fish described in 1989
Fish of the Mekong Basin
Fish of Cambodia
Fish of Laos
Fish of Thailand